Boslanti is a village of Matawai Maroons in the resort of Boven Saramacca in the Sipaliwini District of Suriname. Boslanti is located on the Saramacca River.

Overview
Boslanti which translates to Forest Land is located in the Central Suriname Nature Reserve. The village was founded in the 19th century, and consists of a cluster of settlements each inhabited by a different maternal lineage.

In 1919, the Moravian Church started missionary activities in the village. From the 1960s onwards, a migration towards the urban area started. The village has a school and a health care clinic is located in neighbouring Poesoegroenoe. In 2020, clean drinking water was provided for the village.

Transport
Boslanti used to accessible by boat only. In the early 20th century, a journey from Paramaribo would take about a week. The village later became accessible by air from the Poesoegroenoe Airstrip. In 2017, a road opened connecting Boslanti to the rest of Suriname.

References

Bibliography
 

Matawai settlements
Populated places in Sipaliwini District